The R126 road is a regional road in Fingal, Ireland.

The official description of the R126 from the Roads Act 1993 (Classification of Regional Roads) Order 2012  reads:

R126: Lissenhall - Portraine, County Dublin

Between its junction with R132 at Lissenhall Great and its terminal point at the car park at Portraine via Hearse Road, Lanestown, Donabate, Bellalease and the Quay Road at Portraine all in the county of Fingal.

See also
Roads in Ireland
National primary road
National secondary road
Regional road

References

Regional roads in the Republic of Ireland
Roads in Fingal
Roads in Swords, Dublin